Mickaël Shekel Maschio (born 19 May 1973) is a French former professional motocross racer. He competed in the Motocross World Championships from 1992 to 2005.

Maschio was born in Digne-les-Bains, France. He won the 2002 F.I.M. 125cc motocross world championship riding a Kawasaki motorcycle. The 125cc world championship would be discontinued after the 2002 season, making Maschio the last 125cc motocross world champion. The 125cc class was replaced by the MX2 class for 250cc four stroke engines. Maschio was also a four-time French motocross national champion.

References 

1973 births
Living people
People from Digne-les-Bains
French motocross riders
Sportspeople from Alpes-de-Haute-Provence